AP, A&P, A-p, Ap, A/P, or ap may refer to:

Arts and entertainment
 AP (rapper) (born 1979), French rapper of Guadeloupean origin
 "AP" (song), 2021 single by Pop Smoke
 The A&P Gypsies, a musical radio program (1924–1936)
 Action point (video gaming), required to be able to do something
 Atomic Puppet, an animated series
 Argyle Park, industrial/experimental band

Publishing
 Academic Press, an American publisher
 Amalgamated Press, an English publisher
 Associated Press, an American news agency
 "A&P" (story), by John Updike
 Alternative Press (music magazine)
 Ang Pamantasan, a Philippine student publication
 Palatine Anthology, a collection of Ancient Greek poems
 Amiga Power, a defunct video games magazine

Education
 Advanced Placement, North American program offering college-level courses at schools
 Austin Peay State University, Clarksville, Tennessee, US

Finance
 Accounts payable, in accounting 
 Hungarian adópengő (currency code: AP)

Organizations
 Agricultural and Pastoral Shows (A&P) in New Zealand
 Administration Police, a Kenyan security unit
 Polish Aero Club
 Armenian Power, an Armenian-American gang in Los Angeles, US
 Atlantic Philanthropies, a foundation

Businesses
 The Great Atlantic & Pacific Tea Company or A&P supermarket chain
 A & P Food Stores Building, St. Louis, Missouri, US
 A&P Canada, former supermarket chain
 A&P Group, a ship repair company, formerly Austin & Pickersgill
 Air One airline, Rome, Italy, IATA code
 Asset protection, retail loss prevention. 
 Atlantic and Pacific Railroad (A&P)
 Audemars Piguet, Swiss watchmaker
 Automotive Products, a former UK company

Politics
 Acción Popular (disambiguation), the name of three political parties in Latin America
 Justice Party (Turkey), a former political party
 People's Action (Romania), a former political party
 People's Alliance (Spain), a former political party
 Labour Party (Norway), a major Norwegian political party

Mythology
 Ap (ghost), a spirit of Khmer folklore
 Ap (water), the waters in Vedic mythology

Places
 Amapá, Brazil (ISO abbreviation "BR-AP")
 Andhra Pradesh, India (ISO abbreviation "IN-AP")
 Province of Ascoli Piceno, Italy, vehicle registration code

Psychology
 Attachment parenting, a parenting philosophy
 Absolute pitch, the ability to identify musical notes without a reference tone

Science and technology

Computing
 AP (complexity), or PSPACE, problems decidable by a Turing machine
 Wireless access point, for WiFi networking
 Address plus Port (A+P), a technique for sharing IPv4 addresses
 Age progression of a photograph to show aging

Mathematics
 Arithmetic progression

Medicine
Acute pancreatitis, a sudden inflammation of the pancreas
Alkaline phosphatase, an enzyme
 Area postrema, a part of the brain
 Colporrhaphy or A&P repair, of vaginal walls

Science
 Ammonium perchlorate
 Ap and Bp stars

Military engineering
 Anomalous propagation, or false radar echoes
 Armor-piercing, a type of ammunition
 Transport support ship (U.S. Navy hull classification symbol: AP)
 A&P mechanic, an aircraft maintenance technician with Airframe and Powerplant ratings

Other uses
 Arthur Paul Harper (1865–1955), New Zealand lawyer, mountaineer, explorer, businessman known as AP
 , a Welsh patronymic
 ap. a classical abbreviation
 Adjective phrase
 a/p is an abbreviation used in 
 Autopilot

See also

 
 
 
 Several abbreviations in list of medical abbreviations: A
 The Great Atlantic & Pacific Tea Company (disambiguation)
 APP (disambiguation)
 APS (disambiguation)